The men's triple jump events at the 2014 World Junior Championships in Athletics took place at Hayward Field in Eugene, Oregon, United States on 25 and 27 July 2014.

Medalists

Records
, the existing world junior and championship records were as follows.

Results

Qualification
Qualification: Standard 15.90 m (Q) or at least 12 best performers (q).

Final
Summary:

References

Men's triple jump
Triple jump at the World Athletics U20 Championships